This is a list of Trotskyist internationals.  It includes all of the many political internationals which self-identify as Trotskyist.

Of the organizations listed, three claim to be the original Fourth International founded in 1938: the reunified Fourth International and the International Committee of the Fourth International (ICFI). Certain organizations which claim to be Trotskyist make no attempt to claim any relationship to the Fourth International in an organizational sense and argue that it no longer exists. Some claim to represent a continuity from the Fourth International or to have re-established it: for example the Fourth International (ICR) International Centre/Center of Reconstruction, also known as the FI (La Verité), also calls itself the "Fourth International". Others argue that the title "Fourth International" is so discredited that a Fifth International or another new organisation is needed.

The various organizations listed here range in size from those having thousands of adherents in dozens of countries to tendencies which can barely claim a dozen members in three or four countries.

List of internationals

Active 

Committee for a Workers' International (CWI) - claims to be refoundation of Committee for a Workers' International (1974)
Committee for Revolutionary International Regroupment (CRIR)
Fourth International (reunified)
International Committee of the Fourth International (ICFI)
International Committee of the Fourth International (Workers Revolutionary Party) 
International Communist League (Fourth Internationalist) (ICL-FI), previously the International Spartacist Tendency
International Marxist Tendency (IMT), previously the Committee for a Marxist International
International Revolutionary Left, split from CWI
International Socialist Alternative, claims to be successor to Committee for a Workers' International (1974)
International Socialist League (ISL-LIS)
International Socialist Tendency (IST (post-trotskyist))
Internationalist Communist Union (ICU)
International Trotskyist Committee for the Political Regeneration of the Fourth International (ITC)
International Workers League – Fourth International (IWL-FI)
International Workers' Unity – Fourth International (IWU-FI)
League for the Fifth International (L5I)
League for the Fourth International (LFI) [split from (ICL-FI)]
League for the Revolutionary Party – Communist Organization for the Fourth International
Trotskyist Fraction – Fourth International (TF-FI)
Workers International to Rebuild the Fourth International (WIRFI)
International Bolshevik Tendency
Bolshevik Tendency
Permanent Revolution Collective 
International Leninist Trotskyist Fraction
Tendency for the Reconstruction of the Fourth International
Internationalist Trotskyist Nucleus-Fourth International
Liaison Committee for the Reconstruction of the Fourth International (CERCI)

Defunct or inactive 
Bolshevik Current for the Fourth International
Collective for an International Conference of the Principled Trotskyism
Liaison Committee of Militants for a Revolutionary Communist International (LCMRCI), 1995–2004
Organizing Committee of Principist Trotskyism (Fourth International)
Committee for a Workers' International (CWI), 1974–2019 – split into Committee for a Workers' International (Refounded) and International Socialist Alternative
Committee for the Fourth International, 1940-
Communist Organisation for a Fourth International, 2003–2007, currently inactive
Coordination Committee for the Construction of the International Workers Party (KoorKom) – dissolved into International Workers' League in 2002
Coordinating Committee for the Refoundation of the Fourth International (CRFI)
Fifth International of Communists
Fourth International (International Committee (FIIC), 1980–1981
Group of Opposition and Continuity of the Fourth International
International Centre for the Reconstruction of the Fourth International (CIRQI)
International Centre of Orthodox Trotskyism
International League for the Reconstruction of the Fourth International (ILRFI), 1973–1995
International Liaison Committee of Communists (ILCC)
International Revolutionary Marxist Tendency (TMRI), 1965–1992 – rejoined the Fourth International (post-reunification)
International Trotskyist Opposition
International Workers' Committee
International New Course
Leninist-Trotskyist Tendency (LTT), 1991–1997
Organizing Committee for the Reconstruction of the Fourth International (CORQI), 1972–1980
Organizing Committee of Principist Trotskyism (Fourth International)
Permanent Revolution
Revolutionary Workers Ferment (Fomento Obrero Revolucionario, FOR)
Trotskyist International Liaison Committee, 1979–1984
Tendência Quarta Internacionalista
Workers' Voice (formerly Revolutionary Trotskyist League, formerly Revolutionary Trotskyist Tendency)
Revolutionary Communist International Tendency
Fourth International (ICR), also called FI (La Verité) or FI (International Secretariat) 1981-2015
Socialist Network (Post-Trotskyist, split from IMT)
Organising Committee for the Reconstitution of the Fourth International (OCRFI), split from Fourth International (ICR) in 2016
Fourth International Posadist
International Leninist Trotskyist Tendency

See also 
 List of Trotskyist organizations by country
 List of left-wing internationals
 List of communist parties
 List of members of the Comintern

References

External links 
 List of socialist internationals
 List of Trotskyist parties and their internationals